In quantum information theory, a quantum channel is a communication channel which can transmit quantum information, as well as classical information.  An example of quantum information is the state of a qubit.  An example of classical information is a text document transmitted over the Internet.

More formally, quantum channels are completely positive (CP) trace-preserving maps between spaces of operators.  In other words, a quantum channel is just a quantum operation viewed not merely as the reduced dynamics of a system but as a pipeline intended to carry quantum information.  (Some authors use the term "quantum operation" to also include trace-decreasing maps while reserving "quantum channel" for strictly trace-preserving maps.)

Memoryless quantum channel 

We will assume for the moment that all state spaces of the systems considered, classical or quantum, are finite-dimensional.

The memoryless in the section title carries the same meaning as in classical information theory: the output of a channel at a given time depends only upon the corresponding input and not any previous ones.

Schrödinger picture 

Consider quantum channels that transmit only quantum information.  This is precisely a quantum operation, whose properties we now summarize.

As required by postulates of quantum mechanics,  needs to be linear.
Since density matrices are positive,  must preserve the cone of positive elements.  In other words,  is a positive map.
If an ancilla of arbitrary finite dimension n is coupled to the system, then the induced map  where In is the identity map on the ancilla, must also be positive. Therefore, it is required that  is positive for all n. Such maps  are called completely positive.
Density matrices are specified to have trace 1, so  has to preserve the trace.

The adjectives completely positive and trace preserving used to describe a map are sometimes abbreviated CPTP.  In the literature, sometimes the fourth property is weakened so that  is only required to be not trace-increasing. In this article, it will be assumed that all channels are CPTP.

Heisenberg picture 

Density matrices acting on HA only constitute a proper subset of the operators on HA and same can be said for system B.  However, once a linear map  between the density matrices is specified, a standard linearity argument, together with the finite-dimensional assumption, allow us to extend  uniquely to the full space of operators.

The spaces of operators L(HA) and L(HB) are Hilbert spaces with the Hilbert–Schmidt inner product. Therefore, viewing  as a map between Hilbert spaces, we obtain its adjoint * given by

While  takes states on A to those on B,  maps observables on system B to observables on A. This relationship is same as that between the Schrödinger and Heisenberg descriptions of dynamics. The measurement statistics remain unchanged whether the observables are considered fixed while the states undergo operation or vice versa.

It can be directly checked that if  is assumed to be trace preserving,  is unital, that is,. Physically speaking, this means that, in the Heisenberg picture, the trivial observable remains trivial after applying the channel.

Classical information 

So far we have only defined quantum channel that transmits only quantum information. As stated in the introduction, the input and output of a channel can include classical information as well. To describe this, the formulation given so far needs to be generalized somewhat. A purely quantum channel, in the Heisenberg picture, is a linear map Ψ between spaces of operators:

that is unital and completely positive (CP). The operator spaces can be viewed as finite-dimensional C*-algebras. Therefore, we can say a channel is a unital CP map between C*-algebras:

Classical information can then be included in this formulation. The observables of a classical system can be assumed to be a commutative C*-algebra, i.e. the space of continuous functions  on some set . We assume  is finite so  can be identified with the n-dimensional Euclidean space  with entry-wise multiplication.

Therefore, in the Heisenberg picture, if the classical information is part of, say, the input, we would define  to include the relevant classical observables. An example of this would be a channel

Notice  is still a C*-algebra. Positivity of a map is defined accordingly. This characterization is not universally accepted; the quantum instrument is sometimes given as the generalized mathematical framework for conveying both quantum and classical information. In axiomatizations of quantum mechanics, the classical information is carried in a Frobenius algebra or Frobenius category.

Examples

States 

A state, viewed as a mapping from observables to their expectation values, is an immediate example of a channel.

Time evolution 

For a purely quantum system, the time evolution, at certain time t, is given by

where  and H is the Hamiltonian and t is the time.  Clearly this gives a CPTP map in the Schrödinger picture and is therefore a channel. The dual map in the Heisenberg picture is

Restriction 

Consider a composite quantum system with state space  For a state

the reduced state of ρ on system A, ρA, is obtained by taking the partial trace of ρ with respect to the B system:

The partial trace operation is a CPTP map, therefore a quantum channel in the Schrödinger picture. In the Heisenberg picture, the dual map of this channel is

where A is an observable of system A.

Observable 

An observable associates a numerical value  to a quantum mechanical effect . (Such a collection is called a POVM.) In the Heisenberg picture, the corresponding observable map  maps a classical observable

to the quantum mechanical one

In other words, one integrate f against the POVM to obtain the quantum mechanical observable. It can be easily checked that  is CP and unital.

The corresponding Schrödinger map  takes density matrices to classical states:

where the inner product is the Hilbert–Schmidt inner product. Furthermore, viewing states as normalized functionals, and invoking the Riesz representation theorem, we can put

Instrument 

The observable map, in the Schrödinger picture, has a purely classical output algebra and therefore only describes measurement statistics. To take the state change into account as well, we define what is called a quantum instrument. Let  be the effects (POVM) associated to an observable. In the Schrödinger picture, an instrument is a map  with pure quantum input  and with output space :

Let

The dual map in the Heisenberg picture is

where  is defined in the following way: Factor  (this can always be done since elements of a POVM are positive) then .
We see that  is CP and unital.

Notice that  gives precisely the observable map. The map

describes the overall state change.

Measure-and-prepare channel 

Suppose two parties A and B wish to communicate in the following manner: A performs the measurement of an observable and communicates the measurement outcome to B classically. According to the message he receives, B prepares his (quantum) system in a specific state. In the Schrödinger picture, the first part of the channel 1 simply consists of A making a measurement, i.e. it is the observable map:

If, in the event of the i-th measurement outcome, B prepares his system in state Ri, the second part of the channel 2 takes the above classical state to the density matrix

The total operation is the composition

Channels of this form are called measure-and-prepare or in Holevo form.

In the Heisenberg picture, the dual map  is defined by

A measure-and-prepare channel can not be the identity map. This is precisely the statement of the no teleportation theorem, which says classical teleportation (not to be confused with entanglement-assisted teleportation) is impossible. In other words, a quantum state can not be measured reliably.

In the channel-state duality, a channel is measure-and-prepare if and only if the corresponding state is separable. Actually, all the states that result from the partial action of a measure-and-prepare channel are separable, and for this reason measure-and-prepare channels are also known as entanglement-breaking channels.

Pure channel 

Consider the case of a purely quantum channel  in the Heisenberg picture. With the assumption that everything is finite-dimensional,  is a unital CP map between spaces of matrices

By Choi's theorem on completely positive maps,  must take the form

where N ≤ nm. A channel with Kraus rank 1 is called pure. The time evolution is one example of a pure channel. This terminology again comes from the channel-state duality. A channel is pure if and only if its dual state is a pure state.

Teleportation 

In quantum teleportation, a sender wishes to transmit an arbitrary quantum state of a particle to a possibly distant receiver. Consequently, the teleportation process is a quantum channel.  The apparatus for the process itself requires a quantum channel for the transmission of one particle of an entangled-state to the receiver.  Teleportation occurs by a joint measurement of the sent particle and the remaining entangled particle.  This measurement results in classical information which must be sent to the receiver to complete the teleportation.  Importantly, the classical information can be sent after the quantum channel has ceased to exist.

In the experimental setting 

Experimentally, a simple implementation of a quantum channel is fiber optic (or free-space for that matter) transmission of single photons.  Single photons can be transmitted up to 100 km in standard fiber optics before losses dominate.  The photon's time-of-arrival (time-bin entanglement) or polarization are used as a basis to encode quantum information for purposes such as quantum cryptography.  The channel is capable of transmitting not only basis states (e.g. |0>, |1>) but also superpositions of them (e.g. |0>+|1>).  The coherence of the state is maintained during transmission through the channel. Contrast this with the transmission of electrical pulses through wires (a classical channel), where only classical information (e.g. 0s and 1s) can be sent.

Channel capacity

The cb-norm of a channel 

Before giving the definition of channel capacity, the preliminary notion of the norm of complete boundedness, or cb-norm of a channel needs to be discussed. When considering the capacity of a channel , we need to compare it with an "ideal channel"  . For instance, when the input and output algebras are identical, we can choose  to be the identity map. Such a comparison requires a metric between channels.
Since a channel can be viewed as a linear operator, it is tempting to use the natural operator norm.

However, the operator norm may increase when we tensor  with the identity map on some ancilla.

To make the operator norm even a more undesirable candidate, the quantity

may increase without bound as  The solution is to introduce, for any linear map  between C*-algebras, the cb-norm

Definition of channel capacity 

The mathematical model of a channel used here is same as the classical one.

Let  be a channel in the Heisenberg picture and  be a chosen ideal channel. To make the comparison possible, one needs to encode and decode Φ via appropriate devices, i.e. we consider the composition

where E is an encoder and D is a decoder. In this context, E and D are unital CP maps with appropriate domains. The quantity of interest is the best case scenario:

with the infimum being taken over all possible encoders and decoders.

To transmit words of length n, the ideal channel is to be applied n times, so we consider the tensor power

The  operation describes n inputs undergoing the operation  independently and is the quantum mechanical counterpart of concatenation.

The quantity

is therefore a measure of the ability of the channel to transmit words of length n faithfully by being invoked m times.

This leads to the following definition:

A sequence  can be viewed as representing a message consisting of possibly infinite number of words. The limit supremum condition in the definition says that, in the limit, faithful transmission can be achieved by invoking the channel no more than r times the length of a word. One can also say that r is the number of letters per invocation of the channel that can be sent without error.

From the definition, it is vacuously true that 0 is an achievable rate for any channel.

Important examples 

As stated before, for a system with observable algebra , the ideal channel  is by definition the identity map . Thus for a purely n dimensional quantum system, the ideal channel is the identity map on the space of n × n matrices . Similarly, a classical system with output algebra  will have an ideal channel denoted by the same symbol. We can now state some fundamental channel capacities.

The channel capacity of the classical ideal channel  with respect to a quantum ideal channel  is

This is equivalent to the no-teleportation theorem: it is impossible to transmit quantum information via a classical channel.

Moreover, the following equalities hold:

The above says, for instance, an ideal quantum channel is no more efficient at transmitting classical information than an ideal classical channel. When n = m, the best one can achieve is one bit per qubit.

It is relevant to note here that both of the above bounds on capacities can be broken, with the aid of entanglement. The entanglement-assisted teleportation scheme allows one to transmit quantum information using a classical channel. Superdense coding. achieves two bit per qubit. These results indicate the significant role played by entanglement in quantum communication.

Classical and quantum channel capacities 

Using the same notation as the previous subsection, the classical capacity of a channel Ψ is

that is, it is the capacity of Ψ with respect to the ideal channel on the classical one-bit system .

Similarly the quantum capacity of Ψ is

where the reference system is now the one qubit system .

Channel fidelity 

Another measure of how well a quantum channel preserves information is called channel fidelity, and it arises from fidelity of quantum states.

Bistochastic quantum channel 
A bistochastic quantum channel is a quantum channel  which is unital, i.e. .

See also
 No-communication theorem
 Amplitude damping channel

References 

 M. Keyl and R. F. Werner, How to Correct Small Quantum Errors, Lecture Notes in Physics Volume 611, Springer, 2002.
 .

Quantum information theory